The list shown below shows the Australia women's national soccer team all-time international record against opposing nations. The stats are composed of FIFA Women's World Cup, OFC Women's Nations Cup, AFC Women's Asian Cup, and Summer Olympic Games matches, as well as numerous international friendly tournaments and matches.

Head to head record
The following table shows Australia's all-time international record, correct as of 22 February 2023 (vs. ). Only "A" internationals are included. Although there is some conjecture regarding the status of a number of games, the table includes all fixtures recognised by Football  Australia as "A" internationals and as such is used to recognise caps, goal scorers, captaincy records, etc.

Best Results
The following table shows Australia's best results against opposition by confederation, Only "A" internationals are included.

UEFA

CONMEBOL

CONCACAF

CAF

AFC

OFC

See also
Australia men's national soccer team all-time record

References

External links
 Matildas official website

Australia women's national soccer team